The Townsend House is a historic house located at 410 North Bonner Street in Ruston, Louisiana.

Originally built in Vienna between c.1885 and 1890, the house is a Queen Anne Revival frame clapboard residence. According to Lincoln Parish Museum and Historical Society, the builindg is  the second oldest structure standing in Ruston, and also one of only two buildings which were moved into Ruston from Vienna when the town became the parish seat. The house was acquired by the Baptist Church of Christ of Ruston in 1890 and was used as a parsonage until 1908, when it was purchased by T.B. Meadows. In August 1920 it became the house of H.E. Townsend, which lived there until his death in 1978.

The house, actually hosting a gift shop, was listed on the National Register of Historic Places on October 8, 1992.

See also
 National Register of Historic Places listings in Lincoln Parish, Louisiana

References

Houses on the National Register of Historic Places in Louisiana
Houses completed in 1885
Queen Anne architecture in Louisiana
Lincoln Parish, Louisiana
National Register of Historic Places in Lincoln Parish, Louisiana